The 1951 Macdonald Brier, the Canadian men's national curling championship, was held from March 6 to 10, 1951 at Dalhousie Memorial Arena in Halifax, Nova Scotia. A total of 17,000 fans attended the event. This would be the first Brier in which a team from Newfoundland would compete, increasing the field from 10 to 11 teams. This arrangement would last until 1975, when a combined Northwest Territories/Yukon entry was added to the field.

Team Nova Scotia, who was skipped by Don Oyler won the Brier Tankard as they finished round robin play unbeaten with a 10–0 record. This was the second time in which Nova Scotia had won the Brier, with their previous title being the inaugural event in 1927. This was the seventh time in which a team finished a Brier undefeated and the first non-Manitoban team to do so. Oyler would quit competitive curling after his Brier championship due to a sore wrist, which effected his delivery.

British Columbia, Manitoba, and Saskatchewan all tied for second with 7-3 records, necessitating a tiebreaker playoff between the three teams for runner-up. British Columbia would ultimately be the runner-up as they defeated Saskatchewan 8–0 in the second tiebreaker game. Saskatchewan defeated Manitoba 9–7 in the first tiebreaker game. This was the last time in the Macdonald era in which there would be a tiebreaker playoff contested for runner-up as going forward, tiebreaker playoff games would only be played if two or more teams were tied for first place.

British Columbia's win over Saskatchewan in the second tiebreaker was the first game in Brier history in which there was a shutout.

Teams
The teams are listed as follows:

Round robin standings

Round robin results

Draw 1
Tuesday, March 6

Draw 2
Tuesday, March 6

Draw 3
Wednesday, March 7

Draw 4
Wednesday, March 7

Draw 5
Thursday, March 8

Draw 6
Thursday, March 8

Draw 7
Friday, March 9

Draw 8
Friday, March 9

Draw 9
Friday, March 9

Draw 10
Saturday, March 10

Draw 11
Saturday, March 10

Playoff

Tiebreaker #1
Saturday, March 10

Tiebreaker #2
Saturday, March 10

References

External links 
 Video: 

Macdonald Brier, 1951
Macdonald Brier, 1951
The Brier
Curling competitions in Halifax, Nova Scotia
Macdonald Brier
Macdonald Brier
20th century in Halifax, Nova Scotia